The Yunnan Plateau subtropical evergreen forests is an endangered ecoregion in southwestern China.  These forests once covered the western parts of the Yungui Plateau but have been significantly reduced and replaced with agricultural land uses.  The Yunnan evergreen forests and the neighbouring Guizhou Plateau broadleaf and mixed forests are the only two ecoregions in the Palearctic realm to be classified as part of tropical and subtropical moist broadleaf forests biome.

Description
Territory that was once covered by the Yunnan Plateau subtropical evergreen forests includes most of the western Yungui Plateau which makes up the eastern half of Yunnan as well as parts of southern Sichuan, western Guizhou, and northwestern Guangxi. The Yungui Plateau is relatively flatter here and human agricultural development has greatly reduced the extent of the Yunnan Plateau evergreen forests.

Climate
This region experiences a mild climate as the high altitude and low latitude negate many of the extreme effects of either climatic feature.

Flora
Today, forest remnants are isolated along mountain ridges, karst hills, and steeper valleys where agriculture is not prevalent. Significant remaining tracts of the evergreen forests include Qinglongxia Scenic Area, the Cang Mountains, Mount Jizu, the Western Hills Forest Reserve, and the Ailao Mountain Nature Reserve. In other places in the ecoregion, the evergreen forests have been replaced by strands of dominating Yunnan pine. It is unclear to what extent Yunnan pine coexisted in the Yunnan Plateau subtropical evergreen forests prior to agricultural development in the region.

Fauna
Animal species that can be found in the Yunnan Plateau subtropical evergreen forests include black gibbons, bamboo rats, and Asiatic black bears.  A notable extirpated species is the tiger.

References

Ecoregions of China
Palearctic ecoregions
Tropical and subtropical moist broadleaf forests